Inca Gold is a novel written by Clive Cussler. First published in 1994, it is the twelfth book in Cussler's Dirk Pitt series.

Plot summary

In 1532 a fleet of ships sails in secret to an island in the middle of an inland sea. There they hide a magnificent treasure more vast than that any Pharaoh would ever possess. Then they disappear, leaving only a great stone demon to guard their hoard.

In 1578 the legendary Sir Francis Drake captures a Spanish galleon filled with Inca gold and silver and the key to the lost treasure, which includes a gigantic chain of gold, a masterpiece of ancient technology so huge that it requires two hundred men to lift it and a large pile of diamonds worth more than 200 billion dollars that belonged to the last Inca. As the galleon is sailed by Drake's crew back to England, an underwater earthquake causes a massive tidal wave that sweeps it into the jungle. Only one man survives to tell the tale...

In 1998 a group of archaeologists is nearly drowned while diving into the depths of a sacrificial pool high in the Andes of Peru. They are saved by the timely arrival of the renowned scuba diving hero Dirk Pitt, who is in the area on a marine expedition. Pitt soon finds out that his life has been placed in jeopardy as well by smugglers intent on uncovering the lost ancient Incan treasure. Soon, he, his faithful companions, and Dr. Shannon Kelsey, a beautiful young archaeologist, are plunged into a vicious, no-holds-barred struggle to survive. From then on it becomes a battle of wits in a race against time and danger to find the golden chain, as Pitt finds himself caught up in a struggle with a sinister international family syndicate that deal in stolen works of art, the smuggling of ancient artifacts, and art forgery worth many millions of dollars. The clash between the art thieves, the FBI and the Customs Service, a tribe of local Indians, and Pitt, along with his friends from NUMA, two of whom are captured and threatened with execution, rushes toward a wild climax in a subterranean world of darkness and death – for the real key to the mystery, as it turns out, is a previously unknown, unexplored underground river that runs through the ancient treasure chamber. The fallen are told to come back and haunt those who took their treasure.

External links
 http://www.bc-alter.net/dfriesen/derrotero.html The Lost Treasure of the Inca
 http://ns.gov.gu/galleon/  on the real Nuestra Senora de la Concepcion, which was sunken in 1638 with Chinese riches.
http://www.geometrics.com/ Producer of the magnometer used to localize the galleon

1994 American novels
Dirk Pitt novels
Novels set in Colombia
Spanish Empire in fiction
Books with cover art by Paul Bacon